Stanjevci (Prekmurje Slovene: Stanjovci) is a village in the Municipality of Gornji Petrovci in the Prekmurje region of Slovenia. The railway from Murska Sobota to Hodoš runs through the settlement, but there is no station in the village.

There is a small chapel north of the main settlement. It was built in 1923 in a Neo-Gothic style.

References

External links
Stanjevci on Geopedia

Populated places in the Municipality of Gornji Petrovci